Events in the year 1790 in Norway.

Incumbents
Monarch: Christian VII

Events
 March – Norwegian merchants meet Gustaf Mauritz Armfelt, as representative of King Gustav III of Sweden, to discuss military hjelp from Sweden to end the Danish-Norwegian union,  at Eda, Sweden.

Arts and literature
 The song «Udsikter fra Ulriken» is written by Johan Nordahl Brun.

Births
1 November - Dominicus Nagell Lemvig Brun, military officer and politician (d.1874)
26 December - Andreas Martin Seip, military officer and politician (d.1850)

Full date unknown
Melchior Schjelderup Olsson Fuhr, politician (d.1869)
Jon Eriksson Helland, Hardanger fiddle maker (d.1862)
Even Hansen, civil servant and politician (d.1840)

Deaths
 4 November - Ove Gjerløw Meyer, jurist and government official (born c. 1742)

See also

References